Caitríona Ní Chléirchín is an Irish writer.

Biography
Ní Chléirchín was born in Emyvale, County Monaghan. Her first collection, Crithloinnir, was published in 2010. It won first prize in the Oireachtas competition for new writers 2010. An Bhrídeach Sí, her second collection of poetry, received the Michael Hartnett Prize in 2015. She is an Irish-language lecturer at University College Dublin.

References

External links
 https://web.archive.org/web/20180810235346/http://www.irishwriters-online.com/ni-chleirchin-caitriona/
 https://www.poetryinternationalweb.net/pi/site/poet/item/21197/30/Caitriona-Ni-Chleirchin
 https://www.irishtimes.com/topics/topics-7.1213540?article=true&tag_person=Caitriona+Ni+Chleircin
 https://stingingfly.org/author/caitriona-ni-chleirchin/

Irish-language poets
Irish women poets
Living people
21st-century Irish people
People from County Monaghan
Year of birth missing (living people)
Translators to Irish